The following list of Sweden international bandy players covers all bandy players with 50 or more official caps for the Sweden national bandy team. The players are listed here sorted first by the total number of caps.

Key

List of players 
.

References 

Sweden
Sweden international bandy players
bandy players
International bandy players